The 2007 Peru Census was a detailed enumeration of the Peruvian population. It was conducted by the Instituto Nacional de Estadística e Informática on Sunday, October 21, 2007. Its full name in Spanish is XI Censo de Población y VI de Vivienda (Eleventh Population and Sixth Household Census). The previous census performed in Peru was the 2005 Census, the following census was the 2017 Peru Census.

Population by region

See also
Instituto Nacional de Estadística e Informática (INEI)

References

External links
 

Censuses in Peru
Demographics of Peru
2007 in Peru
Peru